Bkassine, Beit Kassin ("village of the disappeared"), is a village in Lebanon surrounded by the Bkassine Pine Forest. The village is near Jezzine.

Former U.S. senator from Maine George Mitchell's mother immigrated from Bkassine.

The village received a National Institute for Heritage award. The village is home to a church where an annual festival celebrating Saint Takla is held. The village includes a square, small souk, and houses adorned with distinctive red tiles.

References

External links
Bkassine, Localiban

Populated places in Jezzine District